Janney House, also known as Morrison House and Janney Hill, is a historic home located at Hamilton, Loudoun County, Virginia.  It was built in 1876, and is a -story, five bay, wood frame I-house in the Late Victorian style.  It sits on a stone foundation and has a standing seam metal side gable roof. It features a one-story, wraparound porch. Also on the property is a contributing combination garage and stable building.

It was listed on the National Register of Historic Places in 2004.

References

Houses on the National Register of Historic Places in Virginia
Victorian architecture in Virginia
Houses completed in 1876
Houses in Loudoun County, Virginia
National Register of Historic Places in Loudoun County, Virginia
1876 establishments in Virginia